Sandra Payne (born 24 September 1944, Royston, Hertfordshire) is an English actress best known for her roles as Miss Mckenzie in Only Fools and Horses Christine Harris in the British television series Triangle and as Marion Ballard in Waiting for God.

Career 
Payne attended Selhurst Grammar School and the Italia Conti Academy. She then acted in repertory theatre before appearing on television in the 1960s in the soap operas Compact, The Newcomers and Z-Cars. In 1978, she appeared as Phillipa in The Professionals episode "Blind Run". Payne appeared as a character called "Penny" in the 1979 Christmas special and final episode of George and Mildred.

She also appeared as Mrs. Quilp in The Old Curiosity Shop, as Miss Taylor in The Wildcats of St Trinian's (1980), as Eryl Griffith in the 1985 television movie Agatha Christie's Miss Marple: The Moving Finger, as Mrs Micawber in David Copperfield (1986) and as Miss Mackenzie (Council Housing Officer) in the Only Fools and Horses episode "Homesick" (1983).

Personal life 
Payne was married to the American lyricist Alan Jay Lerner from 1974 to 1976. Payne was Lerner's sixth wife— he and Payne married in Port au Prince, Haiti, on 10 December 1974, one day after Lerner received a Haitian divorce from his fifth wife.

In 1979, Payne married English filmmaker Roy Boulting; they divorced in 1983. Boulting directed Payne in Agatha Christie's Miss Marple: The Moving Finger in 1985.

Filmography

Film

Television

References

External links

1944 births
Living people
English stage actresses
English television actresses
Alumni of the Italia Conti Academy of Theatre Arts